Jhonatan dos Santos Rosa (born 9 September 2002), known as Jhon Jhon or just Jhonatan, is a Brazilian footballer who plays as a midfielder for Palmeiras.

Club career
Born in Vitória, Espírito Santo, Jhon Jhon joined Primavera's youth setup after being spotted by former player Deco when playing for Portuguese club Boavista. He made his senior debut with the club during the 2021 Campeonato Paulista Série A3, scoring once in four matches.

On 5 May 2021, Jhon Jhon was loaned to Palmeiras, being initially assigned to the under-20 squad. He made his first team – and Série A – debut on 10 December, coming on as a second-half substitute for goalscorer Kevin in a 1–0 home win over Ceará.

On 3 January 2022, Jhon Jhon signed a permanent deal with Verdão until 2026. After spending the year with the under-20s, he was promoted to the first team ahead of the 2023 campaign.

Personal life
Jhon Jhon's father Marcelo Pelé was also a footballer. A forward, he notably represented Atlético Mineiro.

Career statistics

Honours
Palmeiras
Campeonato Brasileiro Série A: 2022
Supercopa do Brasil: 2023

References

External links
Palmeiras profile 

2002 births
Living people
People from Vitória, Espírito Santo
Brazilian footballers
Association football midfielders
Campeonato Brasileiro Série A players
Sociedade Esportiva Palmeiras players